Historieätarna (The History Eaters) is an infotainment series that first appeared on Sveriges Television during the fall and winter of 2012, produced by Karin af Klintberg, starring Erik Haag and Lotta Lundgren as the reporters and Fredrik Lindström and Björn Gustafsson as sidekicks. The British predecessor called The Supersizers... was first broadcast in 2007 on BBC2.

The program follows the two presenters as they "live" in a certain time period. They dress up in period accurate clothes, and live life as you would in that certain time period with a large emphasis on the food. Each program features a guest chef who prepares period accurate food.

On Boxing Day 2013, a Christmas special, Historieätarna firar jul (Historieätarna Celebrates Christmas) was aired. It featured various types of Christmas food and Christmas celebrations starting 1000 years ago and ending in modern times. A second season aired in the fall of 2014, mostly following the same format, but without Lindström and Gustafsson.

A third season aired in the fall of 2016, this season featured six different time periods including the 1950s, 1990s, medieval Sweden and Sweden under king Gustav III during the 18th century. It was originally reported that this third season would be the last, but SVT later announced that it was not decided for sure and that there may be more seasons in the future.

List of episodes

Season 1

Special episode

Season 2

Season 3

References

External links
Official website

Television in Sweden
Historical television series
Historiography of Sweden
Sveriges Television original programming